Lee Gi-ho (1 October 1945 – 3 August 2022) was a South Korean politician. He served as Minister of Labor from 1997 to 1999.

Lee died on 3 August 2022, at the age of 76.

References

1945 births
2022 deaths
South Korean academics
Labor ministers of South Korea
20th-century South Korean politicians
Seoul National University alumni
Boston University alumni